Largs North railway station is located on the Outer Harbor line. Situated in the north-western Adelaide suburb of Largs North, it is 16.4 kilometres (10¼ miles) from Adelaide station. Journeys to and from the Adelaide station usually take 30 minutes.

History 
The station opened on 21 August 1916 as 'Swansea' after H. C. Swan. The station was renamed Largs North on 1 November 1945.

Services by platform

References

Rails Through Swamp and Sand – A History of the Port Adelaide Railway.  M. Thompson  pub. Port Dock Station Railway Museum (1988)  

Railway stations in Adelaide
Railway stations in Australia opened in 1916
Lefevre Peninsula